Meinhard Egilsson Olsen (born 10 April 1997) is a Faroese footballer, who plays as a midfielder for Mjøndalen in 1. divisjon. and for the Faroe Islands national football team.

Club career 
On 21 August 2020, Olsen joined Superettan team GAIS for the remainder of the 2020 season. He left at the end of the season.

Career statistics

Club

International career
He made his Faroe Islands national football team debut on 7 June 2019 in a Euro 2020 qualifier against Spain, as an 86th-minute substitute for Árni Frederiksberg. He scored his first goal for the Faroe Islands national team on 25 March 2021 in a 1-1 draw in the 2022 FIFA World Cup qualification against Moldova.

International Goals

References

External links

1997 births
Living people
Faroese footballers
Faroe Islands international footballers
Association football midfielders
NSÍ Runavík players
Vendsyssel FF players
B36 Tórshavn players
Kristiansund BK players
GAIS players
Bryne FK players
Faroe Islands Premier League players
Danish 1st Division players
Eliteserien players
Superettan players
Norwegian First Division players
Faroese expatriate footballers
Expatriate men's footballers in Denmark
Expatriate footballers in Norway
Faroese expatriate sportspeople in Norway
Expatriate footballers in Sweden
Faroese expatriate sportspeople in Sweden